Mark Anthony Z. "Macky" Escalona (born September 27, 1984) is a Filipino former professional basketball player. He last played for the Barangay Ginebra Kings of the Philippine Basketball Association (PBA). He was drafted 10th overall by the Kings in the 2007 PBA draft.

Player profile
Escalona played college basketball for the Ateneo Blue Eagles. He also played for Cebuana Lhuiller-Kwarta Padala Moneymen in the Philippine Basketball League before moving to the Barangay Ginebra Kings in the Philippine Basketball Association.

Appearances in media
Escalona was one of the finalists in the Myx VJ Search 2008, but failed to win.

External links
Macky Escalona at PBA.ph

1984 births
Living people
Barangay Ginebra San Miguel players
Filipino men's basketball players
Participants in Philippine reality television series
Point guards
Basketball players from Quezon City
Ateneo Blue Eagles men's basketball players
VJs (media personalities)
Barangay Ginebra San Miguel draft picks